XK is an ISO 3166-1 alpha-2 equivalent user-assigned code element used to represent Kosovo.

Use
The following organizations have been known to have used the code  to represent Kosovo:
European Commission and in line with that many institutions in EU countries such as Deutsche Bundesbank, Ireland, Malta, and France
 United Kingdom
 Canada
 Switzerland
 People’s Republic of China
International Monetary Fund 
Society for Worldwide Interbank Financial Telecommunication
Common Locale Data Repository
Unicode Regional indicator symbol
United States Department of State

Potential assignment of an official ISO 3166-1 code for Kosovo
According to rules of procedure followed by the ISO 3166 Maintenance Agency, a new ISO 3166-1 code for Kosovo will be issued once it appears in the UN Terminology Bulletin "Country Names" or in the UN Statistics Division's "list of Country and Region Codes for Statistical Use". To appear in the terminology bulletin, Kosovo must either (a) be admitted into the United Nations, (b) join a UN Specialised Agency or (c) become a state party to the Statute of the International Court of Justice. Criterion (b) was met when Kosovo joined the International Monetary Fund and World Bank in June 2009, however a terminology bulletin has yet to be circulated.

ISO affirms that no code beginning with "X" will ever be standardised as a country code. ("XK" for Kosovo is a unilateral "user assigned code" and not an ISO 3166 standard country code.) Consequently if/when Kosovo is recognised, this XK code will need to be replaced with one beginning with another letter.

See also
.xk

Notes

References

Communications in Kosovo